Zelle may refer to:

Places
 Bloße Zelle, highest elevation on the Hils in Germany
 Zelle, village in the borough of Aue in the German federal state of Saxony
 Zelle Abbey, former Augustinian monastery in the village

Arts
 The Glass Cell (film) (German: Die gläserne Zelle), 1978 West German crime film
 Zelle (band), a Filipino alternative pop/rock band
 Sebastian Zelle, member of the bands NEXX and Supernatural

Others
 Anti-Imperialist Cell (German: Antiimperialistische Zelle), leftist militant group that carried out bombings in Germany in 1995
 Jere language (also Zelle), Nigerian dialect cluster
 Margaretha Zelle, better known as Mata Hari, the spy
 Zelle (payment service), a person-to-person payment service in the United States

See also
 Zell (disambiguation)
 Zella (disambiguation)
 Zele (disambiguation)